Solvalla Stockholm is temporary motorsport race track in Sweden. The circuit is located the Bromma district on west of the Swedish capital Stockholm. Rather using the streets of the city, the track itself will use the horse racing venue, making it the first stadium circuit in Sweden.

It was announced that the venue would host the final round of the 2012 Scandinavian Touring Car Championship season. The championship returned to Solvalla for the next five seasons, before being dropped from the calendar for the 2018 season.

Lap records 

The official race lap records at the Solvalla are listed as:

External links

References

Motorsport venues in Sweden
Sports venues in Stockholm
Defunct motorsport venues